The Residences at the Ritz-Carlton may refer to:
The Residences at The Ritz-Carlton (Philadelphia), a luxury residential skyscraper in Philadelphia, Pennsylvania, United States
The Residences at the Ritz-Carlton (Toronto), a luxury hotel and residential skyscraper in Toronto, Ontario, Canada

See also
Ritz-Carlton, a brand of luxury hotels